Peters Dome is a  mountain in the central Alaska Range, in Denali National Park,  northwest of Denali. It is described as a glacier-covered dome.

See also
Mountain peaks of Alaska

References

Alaska Range
Mountains of Denali Borough, Alaska
Mountains of Alaska
Denali National Park and Preserve